The Technical Museum of East Iceland, located in Seyðisfjörður, Iceland, was established in 1984 as one of four specialized museums in the so-called Eastfjords area of Iceland.  The museum later accepted the responsibility of also being a local heritage museum for the Seyðisfjörður area.

The museum is closed at the moment because of a mud slide in 2020 that damaged large parts of the museum.

References

Museums established in 1984
Museums in Iceland